Vítor Cruz de Jesus (Vera Cruz, Bahia, February 1, 1987), is a Brazilian footballer who acts as a midfielder. He currently plays for Grêmio Catanduvense.

Career
played for Atlético Paranaense.

Career statistics
(Correct )

Contract
 Atlético Paranaense: 14 July 2010 to 31 December 2013

References

1987 births
Sportspeople from Bahia
Living people
Brazilian footballers
Club Athletico Paranaense players
Clube de Regatas Brasil players
Association football midfielders